Plagiorchis vespertillionis, also sometimes listed as Plagiorchis vespertilionis, is a species of trematode that parasitizes bats. 
It was described as a new species in 1780 based on specimens collected from a brown long-eared bat in Denmark.
In 2007, it was documented within a human host for the first time.

References

Animals described in 1780
Taxa named by Otto Friedrich Müller
Plagiorchiidae
Parasites of bats